Sergey Alexandrovich Solnechnikov (19 August 1980 – 28 March 2012) was a Russian military officer, who at the cost of his own life saved his subordinates covering a grenade. During training exercises on March 28, 2012 at a military base near the town of Belogorsk, major Solnechnikov pushed a soldier away from an unsuccessfully thrown grenade and threw himself over it after it bounced back into the trench they were in with dozens of soldiers standing nearby. Solnechnikov received serious injuries and died. He was honored as a Hero of the Russian Federation, posthumously.

References

1980 births
2012 deaths
People from Potsdam
Heroes of the Russian Federation
Deaths by hand grenade
Accidental deaths in Russia